The Men's 1989 World Amateur Boxing Championships were held in Moscow, Soviet Union from September 17 to October 1, 1989. The fifth edition of this competition, held a year after the Summer Olympics in Seoul, South Korea, was organised by the world governing body for amateur boxing AIBA.

Medal table

Medal winners

External links 
Results on Amateur Boxing

World Amateur Boxing Championships
World Amateur Boxing Championships
AIBA World Boxing Championships
B
Boxing
International boxing competitions hosted by Russia
September 1989 sports events in Europe
1989 in Moscow
1989 in Russian sport